A Celebrated Case is a 1914 American silent drama film starring Alice Joyce, Guy Coombs and Marguerite Courtot. It is based on the 1877 play Une cause célèbre by Adolphe Philippe Dennery and Eugene Cormon. A French soldier is wrongfully sentenced to the galleys for the murder of his wife.

It is considered to be a lost film.

Cast
Alice Joyce as Madeline Renaud
Guy Coombs as Jean Renaud
Marguerite Courtot as Adrienne
James B. Ross as Adrienne's Father
Harry F. Millarde as Lazare
Alice Hollister

References

External links

Silent American drama films
American silent feature films
American black-and-white films
American films based on plays
Lost American films
1914 drama films
1914 films
1914 lost films
Lost drama films
1910s American films